WXRS-FM (100.5 FM) is a radio station broadcasting a country music format.  Licensed to Swainsboro, Georgia, United States, the station is currently owned by Radiojones, LLC and features programming from ABC Radio.

References

External links

XRS-FM
Radio stations established in 1950